Mihail Majearu (born 15 July 1960 in Galaţi) is a Romanian former professional footballer who played as a right back or midfielder. He played for Steaua București and was part of their European Cup victory in 1986, despite missing his penalty in the shootout in the final. He also played for FCM Galaţi, FC Inter Sibiu, Panachaiki Patra, Gloria Bistriţa, Corvinul Hunedoara and CFR Timişoara. He was capped once by Romania.

On 25 March 2008 he was decorated by the president of Romania, Traian Băsescu with Ordinul "Meritul Sportiv" – (The Order of "Merit in Sport") class II for his part in winning the 1986 European Cup Final.

Majearu is currently in charge with a youth team at Steaua București.

Honours

Club 
Steaua București
Romanian Championship: 1984–85, 1985–86, 1986–87, 1987–88
Romanian Cup: 1984–85, 1986–87, 1987–88
European Cup: 1985–86
European Super Cup: 1986

Gloria Bistrița
Romanian Cup: 1993–94

References

External links

1960 births
Living people
Sportspeople from Galați
Romanian footballers
Romania international footballers
Liga I players
Liga II players
FC Inter Sibiu players
FCM Dunărea Galați players
FC Steaua București players
Panachaiki F.C. players
ACF Gloria Bistrița players
CS Corvinul Hunedoara players
FC CFR Timișoara players
Romanian expatriate footballers
Expatriate footballers in Greece
Association football midfielders